Kile Smith (born August 24, 1956) is an American composer of choral, vocal, orchestral, and chamber music. The Arc in the Sky with The Crossing received a 2020 Grammy nomination for Best Choral Performance, and the Canticle CD by Cincinnati's Vocal Arts Ensemble helped win the 2020 Classical Producer of the Year Grammy for Blanton Alspaugh. A Black Birch in Winter, which includes Smith's Where Flames a Word, won the 2020 Estonian Recording of the Year for Voces Musicales.

His writings, mostly on composing and music, are published in the Philadelphia arts and culture online magazine Broad Street Review. He was curator of the Fleisher Collection of Orchestral Music at the Free Library of Philadelphia 1993–2011. He writes and hosts the monthly Fleisher Discoveries podcast, 2018–present, and co-hosted, produced, and wrote Discoveries from the Fleisher Collection on Philadelphia's WRTI-FM, 2002-2018. He is the recipient of a 2018 Independence Foundation Fellowship in the Arts for his first opera, The Book of Job.

Biography

Early life and musical influences 
Kile Smith was born in Camden, N.J., and lived in Pennsauken, N.J. until 1975. He has lived in or near Philadelphia ever since. His parents are Leighton Edward Smith (b. 1928) and Carol Pauline (née Kile) Renne (b. 1929).

He was in the New Jersey All-State Chorus 1973, 1974. Smith credits this as helping to turn him toward composition. Entranced by the Brahms Nänie in the year his older sister Carole sang in All-State (1970), he later searched for a commercial recording and found a two-record album with the Orchestre de la Suisse Romande conducted by Ernest Ansermet. He eventually listened to the largest work on the album, the Brahms German Requiem, the opening of which so transfixed him, he has related, that he decided in 1973, age 17, to become a composer.

College years 
Smith attended Philadelphia College of Bible (now Cairn University) as a double major leading to Bachelor's degrees in Bible and Music Composition. His composition teachers were Edwin T. Childs and Chris Woods.

In 1979 Smith married Jacqueline Hardman, also a student at Philadelphia College of Bible, the daughter of the Rev. Jack Hardman (1929–1987) and Dorothy Pinckney Hardman (1930–1994).

He went to Temple University in 1980, receiving the M.Mus. in Music Composition in 1983. His composition teachers were Clifford Taylor and Maurice Wright. Smith received Alumnus of the Year awards from both Temple (2010) and Cairn (2012).

Work career 
Smith conducted the choir at Immanuel Baptist Church in Maple Shade, New Jersey, 1977–78 and conducted the choir at Lower Merion Baptist Church, Bryn Mawr, Pennsylvania 1980–85, with his wife as organist. He began working part-time as a music copyist at the Fleisher Collection of Orchestral Music, "the world's largest circulating collection of orchestral performance sets," at the Free Library of Philadelphia in 1981, while studying for his master's degree. He was appointed full-time music copyist in 1983, copyist supervisor in 1986, assistant curator in 1988, and curator in 1993, a position he held until retiring in 2011 to compose full-time. He is the longest-serving curator of the Collection.

He and Jack Moore began the monthly radio broadcast Discoveries from the Fleisher Collection in October 2002 on WRTI-FM, Philadelphia's classical music and jazz station. Smith produced the show and wrote an online essay for each broadcast. He began substituting as a classical music host on WRTI in 2005, and in 2008 began hosting and producing a weekly American new music program, Now Is the Time. After retiring from the Fleisher Collection in 2011, Smith accepted more duties at WRTI, producing and voicing Arts Desk features, increased classical hosting duties, writing, editing, audio editing, voicing, interviewing and producing interviews, and serving 2016–17 as interim director of content. Smith left WRTI in 2017 to resume full-time composing. He continues to host and write Fleisher Discoveries as a monthly podcast, produced by the Fleisher Collection and the Free Library, beginning in December 2018.

As adjunct faculty he taught composition at Ursinus College in 2020, composition, advanced orchestration, and music history at Cairn University, 2010–16, and music notation at Temple University, 2012. He has taught private composition since 1993.

Personal life 
Smith is married to the soprano, organist, and conductor Jacqueline Smith; they live in Huntingdon Valley, Pa. They have three daughters: Priscilla Herreid (b. 1986), an oboist, Baroque oboist, recorderist, and performer on Renaissance winds; Elena Smith (b. 1995), a cellist, Baroque cellist, and gambist; and Martina Smith (b. 1997), a French hornist. He sang and played percussion in the Medieval/Renaissance group Quidditas with his wife, daughters, and other singers and instrumentalists in the early 2000s, performing in concert a few times a year. He is a cantor and sings in the choir of Holy Trinity Evangelical Lutheran Church in Abington, Pa., where Jacqueline has been director of music and organist since 2000, and in two other choirs she directs, Musica Concordia and the Franklinville-Schwarzwald Männerchor. He is an avid photographer.

Composing

Early career 
Smith's earliest compositions, from 1974, were art songs and choral anthems. Among his earliest extant works are settings of Shelley poems (Three Songs, No. 1, 1978) and a setting of Donne's "Batter My Heart, Three-Person'd God" (from Three Songs, No. 3, 1979). He wrote anthems for Lower Merion Baptist Church, and continued to compose for church choirs in which he sang and for which his wife was the organist/director, at Tabor Evangelical Lutheran Church, Philadelphia (1986–2000), and Holy Trinity Lutheran, where he began composing liturgical music in addition to anthems.

His Sinfonietta for orchestra (1983), his largest work until then, was performed by the Temple University Contemporary Music Orchestra under Clifford Taylor, and was his first reviewed piece, by Daniel Webster in the Philadelphia Inquirer. His 1986 Sonata for Tuba and Piano was composed for Brian Brown, and in 1988 he orchestrated it into the Concerto for Tuba and Orchestra, which Brown played with the Orchestra Society of Philadelphia under Mark Laycock that year. In 1989 he set three Poems of Gerard Manley Hopkins for his wife Jacqueline Smith to sing, accompanied by Samuel Hsu, at the Hopkins Centennial Conference, St. Joseph's University, Philadelphia. In 1990 the Concerto Soloists (now the Chamber Orchestra of Philadelphia) premiered his Hymn and Fugue No. 1 for string orchestra under founding director Marc Mostovoy.

He composed two chamber works for Philadelphia's Davidsbund Chamber Players, Hymn and Fugue No. 2 (piano trio, 1993) and Hymn and Fugue No. 3 (piano trio with alto saxophone, 1994). The Totentanz for solo guitar was premiered in 1994 by William Ghezzi at the George Antheil Music Festival in Trenton, N.J. He composed Variations on a Theme of Schubert for solo piano in 1997, Paul S. Jones premiering it at a Cairn University concert honoring the 25th anniversary of Samuel Hsu's teaching there. Smith added a movement and orchestrated it in 1999 for the premiere by Makiko Hirata with the Jupiter Symphony in New York City, conducted by Jens Nygaard, as part of Smith's 1999-2001 composer residency.

Since 2000 
For Jupiter he also orchestrated Poems of Gerard Manley Hopkins (2000) for tenor and orchestra. In 2001 Jupiter premiered The Three Graces for solo oboe, horn, cello, and strings (Gerard Reuter, Karl Kramer,  Wolfram Kössel, soloists), a work of written-out jazz intended to sound like improvisation, in one of the last Jupiter concerts conducted by Jens Nygaard before his death. Smith has used jazz in other works: An April Breeze (2002, premiered 2003) for solo trumpet and concert band, composed for the Philadelphia High School for the Creative and Performing Arts under Kevin Rodgers, with soloist John Thyhssen; the 45-minute song cycle for mezzo-soprano and baritone, In This Blue Room (2015), commissioned by Lyric Fest; Adieu, Adieu (2018), commissioned by Relâche; The Arc in the Sky, commissioned by The Crossing; the song "Blue Lobster" (2020), commissioned by Benjamin Flanders; and April Showers (2021), a five-song cycle commissioned by Conspirare.

Vespers 
Piffaro, the Renaissance Band commissioned Vespers (2008) from Smith for their group of seven musicians playing 27 instruments, and the new-music choir The Crossing. The subsequent recording on the Innova label and dozens of favorable reviews brought Smith's name to international attention.

Gramophone Magazine called it "a spectacular work." David Patrick Stearns of the Philadelphia Inquirer called it Smith's "creative breakthrough." Musicweb International chose Vespers as its January 2010 Recording of the Month,. Peter Burwasser, writing for Fanfare Magazine, put it on his 2009 Want List, and writing for the Philadelphia City Paper, included it on his 2009 Top Ten Classical list. After 2015 concerts by Seraphic Fire, David Fleshler wrote in the South Florida Classical Review that "the work sounds like no other music."

Vespers has received numerous performances by professional and university choirs, and one amateur choir. Smith has transcribed much of it for different combinations of modern and Baroque instruments, and individual movements are performed separately, including several movements Choral Arts Philadelphia, under Matthew Glandorf, commissioned and premiered in 2018, arranged for the instrumentation of the J. S. Bach Cantata No. 1, Wie schön leuchtet der Morgenstern.

Compositional style 
Smith's music is modal and tonal. His voice-leading is meticulous, especially from Vespers (2008) on. Although he employs chromaticism on occasion, sometimes heavily, as in the middle movement of Where Flames a Word  and in various songs, his pieces usually remain in one mode or key for extended periods. His music has always favored horizontal movement over vertical chord-building, which can lead to unexpected passing harmonies. Steven Ritter of Audiophile Audition wrote in his review of Vespers: "I'll call this music tonal with a twist; though modern, and it has some contemporary edges to it, it still feels almost uncomfortably familiar, a masterly mélange of old and new." Counterpoint of independent voices has become a greater hallmark of his style since Vespers. He stated in an interview on the composing of Canticle that text-painting is always important in his choral and vocal music. Performers and critics have noted the "vocal quality" of his music.

Works

Orchestral 
Smith has composed over 20 orchestral works, including a Symphony: Lumen ad revelationem (2002) premiered by the Lehigh Valley Chamber Orchestra. The English Symphony Orchestra under Kenneth Woods premiered his orchestration of The Bremen Town Musicians in 2021 with Gemma Whelan, narrator. His cello concerto And Seeing the Multitudes (2014) was commissioned by the Helena Symphony Orchestra and premiered by them with Ovidiu Marinescu, conducted by Allan R. Scott, as part of Smith's 2014–15 residency. Shorter works include overtures for Helena (Gold and Silver, 2014), and Susquehanna Symphony Orchestra (Susquehanna, 2017). His works have been performed by the Chamber Orchestra of Philadelphia, the Delaware, Helena, Missoula, Grand Rapids, and Jackson (Tenn.) symphonies, the Ocean City Pops, and the Sofia, Sofia Youth, and Shumen State Philharmonics of Bulgaria.

He composed Exsultet (2007), horn and strings, for Jennifer Montone, principal horn of the Philadelphia Orchestra. The Red Book of Montserrat for strings was commissioned by the youth orchestra Philadelphia Sinfonia, and uses tunes from the 14th-century Llibre Vermell de Montserrat.

He orchestrated the solo piano (1997) Variations on a Theme of Schubert for piano with chamber orchestra (1999), and The Bremen Town Musicians, originally for violin, cello, and narrator (2008) for chamber orchestra (2016) for the English Symphony Orchestra. His Three Dances is in two versions: for chamber orchestra (1995) and string orchestra (1998, rev. 2012, 13).

Chamber, solo 
Smith has composed about three dozen chamber and solo instrumental works, including There's a Land Beyond the River (2021) for clarinet and piano, premiered by Philadelphia Orchestra principal clarinet Ricardo Morales as an encore with the Southeastern Pennsylvania Symphony Orchestra in 2021. The Bremen Town Musicians appeared on the Philadelphia Orchestra's Our City, Your Orchestra chamber series, 2021.

Other chamber works include Adieu, Adieu (2018) for Relâche, The Nobility of Women (2011) for a Baroque sextet, Spirituals for Piano Trio (2018) for the Arcadian Trio, and two sets of American Spirituals, for violin and piano (2006, for Philadelphia Orchestra concertmaster David Kim) and cello and piano (2008, for Pittsburgh Symphony principal cello Anne Martindale Williams). Red-tail and Hummingbird (2013), commissioned jointly by Orchestra 2001 and Piffaro, The Renaissance Band, exists in many versions for mixed chamber ensembles of six parts, and in a version for brass quintet commissioned by the Philadelphia Brass.

Gaudete Brass in Chicago commissioned Annunciation and Magnificat (2016) for optional narrator and brass quintet. The Three Graces is in two versions: orchestral, for oboe, horn, cello, and strings (2001), and for soloists plus piano and double bass (2008). Ursinus College commissioned This Broad Land and The Better Angels of Our Nature (2010) for bassoon (or soprano saxophone) and piano.

Abington Presbyterian Church (Pa.) commissioned Two Meditations on Freu dich sehr (2013) for organist Alan Morrison for the inaugural recital on their rebuilt Möller organ. The Philadelphia Chapter, American Guild of Organists commissioned Reflection (2017); David Furniss premiered it on the Fred J. Cooper Memorial Organ for the 10th anniversary of its installation in Verizon Hall, the Kimmel Center, Philadelphia. It has been performed often since and is published by ECS Publishing.

Choral 
Kile Smith's choral works include more than two dozen concert works (both sacred and secular), and more than two dozen church anthems. His Vespers received dozens of reviews of its performances and CD. He is published by Hal Leonard, GIA, and Concordia, and many of his works are distributed through MusicSpoke.

The Crossing has commissioned Smith more than any other composer; he has written, in addition to Vespers (commissioned by Piffaro), six works for them: Where Flames a Word (2009, texts of Paul Celan), The Waking Sun (2011, texts of Seneca), The Consolation of Apollo (2014, texts of Boethius and the crew of Apollo 8), May Day (2015, poem by Ryan Eckes), You Are Most Welcome (2016, text from emails by The Crossing co-founder Jeffrey Dinsmore, who died in 2014), and The Arc in the Sky (2018), a concert-length work on texts by Robert Lax.

Canticle, a concert-length setting of A Spiritual Canticle of the Soul and the Bridegroom Christ by St. John of the Cross, was commissioned by Cincinnati's Vocal Arts Ensemble and premiered by them in 2016 under Craig Hella Johnson. Johnson, with Conspirare of Austin, Texas, commissioned The Dawn's Early Light (2019) (with the Los Angeles Guitar Quartet and cello) and April Showers (2021). Agnus Dei (2015) was commissioned by the Mendelssohn Club of Philadelphia as a companion to the Wolfgang Amadeus Mozart Great Mass in C minor. Lyric Fest and the Pennsylvania Girlchoir, under director Mark Anderson, commissioned Two Laudate Psalms (2009) for high voice, girls' choir, and piano; the Girlchoir then commissioned, under director Vincent Metallo, How Do I Love Thee (2014, text by Elizabeth Barrett Browning). Piffaro commissioned Ave Maris Stella (2020) to be performed with Variant 6; the premiere, postponed by the COVID-19 pandemic, is scheduled for October 2021.

Anthems have been commissioned by the Episcopal Cathedral of Boston, Bryn Mawr Presbyterian Church (Pa.), The Church of the Holy Trinity in Philadelphia (resident composer, 2012–present), Knox Presbyterian Church, Cincinnati, Presbyterian Church of Barrington (Ill.), Holy Trinity Evangelical Lutheran Church (Abington, Pa.), and many others. Mass for Philadelphia was commissioned for the 2012 annual conference of the Association of Anglican Musicians. Smith has composed 14 hymns.

Vocal 
He has composed more than 70 songs. These include three song cycles: the 17-song, 45-minute cycle for mezzo-soprano, baritone, and piano In This Blue Room (2015), texts of Philadelphia-area women poets inspired by the batik paintings of Laura Madeleine, commissioned and premiered by Lyric Fest, for whom he was resident composer 2014–15; Plain Truths (2011, 13) for baritone and piano or string quartet with optional chorus, commissioned by the Newburyport Chamber Music Festival, texts by Newburyport authors including the abolitionist William Lloyd Garrison; and April Showers (2021), commissioned by Conspirare, new music for 1920s popular song lyrics. Shorter collections of songs include Poems of Gerard Manley Hopkins (1989, 2000) and Poems of Stephen Berg (2000), commissioned by Network for New Music.

Opera 
Smith is composing his first opera, The Book of Job, for which he is the librettist. For one soloist with choir and about 75 minutes long, it is scheduled to premiere in the 2022/23 season with Conspirare (Austin, Tex.) and The Crossing (Philadelphia).

Discography 
 American Spirituals, Book One. David Kim, Paul Jones. The Lord Is My Shepherd. PSJ Music, 2006
 American Spirituals, Book Two. Anne Martindale Williams, Paul Jones. Sacred Music for Cello. PSJ Music, 2009
 The Arc in the Sky. The Crossing, 2019
 The Bremen Town Musicians. Auricolae. The Double Album. New Focus, 2009
 Canticle and Alleluia. Vocal Arts Ensemble, 2018
 A Child's Afternoon. Anna Meyers, fl, Erik Meyers, org. Fantasmagoria. 2020
 The Dawn's Early Light. Conspirare, Los Angeles Guitar Quartet, cellist Douglas Harvey. The Singing Guitar. Delos, 2019
 Four French Carols. Westminster Brass. Christmas Celebration. Westminster Brass, 2004
 In This Blue Room, Songs of Kile Smith. Lyric Fest. Roven Records, 2018
 The Nobility of Women. Mélomanie. Excursions. Meyer Media, 2012
 Penmaen Pool, from Poems of Gerard Manley Hopkins. Nancy Ogle, Ginger Yang Hwalek. An Evening with Gerard Manley Hopkins. Capstone, 1999
 A Song of Sonia Sanchez. Latin Fiesta. Amor a la Vida. Latin Fiesta, 2005
 The Stars Shine, from The Consolation of Apollo. The Same Stream. Same Stream, 2015
 Veni Sancte Spiritus, from Vespers. Fine Music. Navona, 2011
 Vespers. Piffaro, The Crossing. Vespers. Navona, 2009
 Where Flames a Word. Chicago Chamber Choir. Live Art. CCC, 2020
 Where Flames a Word. Khorikos. Joy and Grief and Rest. Bandcamp, 2019
 Where Flames a Word. Voces Musicales. MSR Classics, 2018
 Where Flames a Word. The Crossing. It Is Time. Navona, 2011

References

External links 
 Official biography at Kile Smith website
 2017 Kile Smith, for the Bel Canto Chorus, Milwaukee, on composing Canticle
 2015 Kile Smith lecture at Lyric Fest on composing In This Blue Room
 2015 film on Kile Smith residency with Lyric Fest, including musical excerpts
 2015 interview of Kile Smith by Mendelssohn Club of Philadelphia for Agnus Dei premiere
 2014 interview of Kile Smith and Sebastian Currier by Donald Nally

1956 births
21st-century American composers
Living people
20th-century American composers
20th-century American male musicians
21st-century American male musicians
Musicians from Camden, New Jersey
Musicians from Philadelphia
People from Pennsauken Township, New Jersey
Classical musicians from New Jersey
Classical musicians from Pennsylvania
Cairn University alumni
Temple University alumni